Sam Weir may refer to:
 Sam Weir (Freaks and Geeks), a character on the American TV series Freaks and Geeks
 Sam Weir (American football), former head coach of the Central Florida Knights college football program
Sam Weir (endurance athlete) (born 1990), Australian ultra-runner